1974 is a year. It may also refer to:

1974 (band), American rock band
1974 AD, Nepali rock band
"1974 (We Were Young)", a song by Amy Grant
 1974, a song on David Crosby's 2018 album "Here if You Listen"